Good is an English surname. Notable people with the name include:
 Andrew Good (born 1979), American baseball player
 Art Good, radio disc jockey
 Bill Good (born 1945), Canadian television personality and radio talk show host
 Carolynne Poole (née Good) (born 1980), English singer-songwriter
 Dorothy Good (Salem witch trials) (c. 1687/1688–?), young child accused of being a witch, daughter of Sarah Good (see below)
 Eileen Good (1893–1986), Australian architect
 Ernst Good (born 1950), Swiss alpine skier
 Herman James Good (1887-1969), Canadian recipient of the Victoria Cross
 Hugh Good (footballer) (1901-1958), Scottish footballer
 I. J. Good (1916-2009), British statistician
 James Isaac Good (1850-1924), American Reformed church clergyman and historian
 James William Good (1866-1929), American politician, Secretary of War under President Hoover
 Jo Good (born 1978), British radio host
 JoAnne Good (born 1955), British broadcaster and actress
 John Mason Good (1764-1827), English writer on medical, religious and classical subjects
 Jonathan Good (born 1985), American professional wrestler better known as Jon Moxley or Dean Ambrose
 La'Myia Good (born 1979), American singer and actress
 Linda Good (fl. 1996-present), songwriter, producer, keyboardist, singer and television and film composer
 Margaret Good (born 1976), American politician
 Mary L. Good (1931-2019), American chemist and educator
 Matthew Good (born 1971), Canadian rock musician
 Meagan Good (born 1981), American actress 
 Michael T. Good (born 1962), NASA astronaut
 Michael R.R. Good (born 1981), American Professor of Theoretical Physics and Cosmology in Kazakhstan
 Nathan Good (born 1975), former drummer of the band Death Cab for Cutie
 Renee Good (born 1985), Canadian-American television host and personality better known as Renee Paquette or Renee Young
 Sarah Good (Salem witch trials) (1653-1692), one of the first three people to be hanged as a result of the Salem witch trials
 Thomas Good (1609–1678), English academic and clergyman, master of Balliol College
 Thomas Good (merchant) (c. 1822–1889) draper and wholesaler of South Australia
 Victoria Good, birth name of BBC Weather forecaster Tori Lacey
 Wilbur Good (1885-1963), American baseball outfielder

Fictional characters
 Mr. Good, a Mr. Men novel series character created by Roger Hargreaves
 Tom and Barbara Good, central characters of the British sitcom The Good Life

See also 
 List of people known as the Good
 Goode (name), a surname
 Gooder, a surname

Surnames from nicknames